Frederick Upton may refer to:

 Frederick Upton (Whirlpool Corporation) (1890–1986), co-founder of the Whirlpool Corporation
 Fred Upton (born 1953), American politician; U.S. Representative from Michigan (grandson of the above)
 George Frederick Upton, 3rd Viscount Templetown (1802–1890), Irish soldier and politician

See also
 Fred Utton (1873–1939), Canadian sports shooter